Henri Jérôme Bertini (28 October 1798 – 30 September 1876) was a French classical composer and pianist. He was born into a family of musicians and attracted the attention of François-Joseph Fétis when he toured Europe as a child prodigy. As an adult he was admired both as a soloist and as a chamber musician; it was said that he played with Johann Nepomuk Hummel's simplicity and elegance without sacrificing the brilliance of the instrument. As a composer he had an original style which was rich in musical ideas, attractive melodies, and effortless harmonies. In 1856, he retired from the musical scene and settled in the Dauphiné in south-east France.

Life 

Henri Jérôme Bertini was born in London on 28 October 1798 but his family returned to Paris six months later. He received his early musical education from his father, a pianist and composer himself, and his elder brother, Auguste, who was a pupil of Muzio Clementi. He was considered a child prodigy and at the age of 12 his father took him on a tour of England, Holland, Flanders, and Germany where he was enthusiastically received. After studies in composition in England and Scotland he was appointed professor of music in Brussels but returned to Paris in 1821. It is known that Bertini gave a concert with Franz Liszt in the Salons Pape on 20 April 1828. The program included a transcription by Bertini of Beethoven's Symphony No. 7 in A major for eight hands (the other pianists were Sowinsky and Schunke.) He was also admired as a chamber music performer, giving concerts with his friends Antoine Fontaine (violin) and Auguste Franchomme (cello). He remained active in and around Paris until around 1856, where he retired to Meylan (near Grenoble). At Meylan he stopped composing and performing in public, living by himself, he became a leader of an  group.

Bertini concertized widely but was not as celebrated a virtuoso as either Friedrich Kalkbrenner or Henri Herz. One of his contemporaries described his playing as having Clementi's evenness and clarity in rapid passages as well as the quality of sound, the manner of phrasing, and the ability to make the instrument sing characteristic of the school of Hummel and Moschelès. Thomas Tapper wrote:

He was in his time a shining example of the most admirable qualities of an artist. Living in an age of garish virtuosity, and hailed as a brilliant executant himself, he maintained nevertheless the most rigorous standards of musicianship in his playing, in his compositions, and in the music which he appeared before the public to interpret. This is the more remarkable when one considers that his manhood was reached during the luxuriant period of French romanticism and that the extravagances of the literary outburst were reflected in the musical movements of the time. Virtuosity was subjected to sore temptations and many succumbed. Bertini stood for the sounder qualities of the artist and gradually acquired an extended and remunerative prestige. His life was singularly devoid of incident and official distinction, but the legacy of pedagogic works which he has left to us and his honorable activity give it every right to be called a success.

Bertini was celebrated as a teacher. Antoine Marmontel, who devoted the second chapter of his work on celebrated pianists to Bertini, wrote

He was unsurpassed as a teacher, giving his lessons with scrupulous care and the keenest interest in his pupils' progress. After he had given up teaching, a number of his pupils continued with me, and I recognized the soundness of the principles drawn from his instruction.

It is above all in the special class of studies and caprices, that Bertini's immense popularity is founded. It is here that he occupied a unique position and opened the path over which the next generation of composers was to rush after him. In each of his numerous collections of studies, embracing every degree of difficulty, he has insistently given to every piece, easy or difficult, brief or extended, a character of salient melody. The technical problem to be overcome presents itself as a song; even where the study is devoted to the problem of velocity the general contour falls into a melodic curve, and this is the first and transcendent cause of the universal success of these pieces, which are, furthermore, natural in respect to rhythm and carefully thought out harmonically.

Robert Schumann, in a review of one of Bertini's piano trios in the Gesammelte Schriften, comments that Bertini writes easily flowing harmony but that the movements are too long. He continues: "With the best will in the world, we find it difficult to be angry with Bertini, yet he drives us to distraction with his perfumed Parisian phrases; all his music is as smooth as silk and satin." German sentimentality has never appreciated French elegance.

Bertini is best remembered today for his piano method Le Rudiment du pianiste, and his 20 books of approximately 500 studies.

Compositions

Nonetto Op. 107

The Nonetto opus 107 for flute, oboe, bassoon, French horn, trumpet, viola, cello, double bass, and piano, composed in 1835, is one of Bertini's major works. Berlioz wrote a review in Maurice Schlesinger's widely distributed and very influential La Revue et Gazette musicale de Paris of a performance at a music evening given by the Tilmant brothers on 6 May 1838:

That same evening a Nonetto by Bertini for piano, viola, cello, oboe, flute, horn, bassoon, trumpet and bass, was performed. It is a great and beautiful composition in which each instrument contributes to the whole according to its importance and idiomatic qualities, without trying to stand out individually. The piano itself is only entrusted those parts which contribute to the musical sense of the moment, and makes no effort toward brilliance for brilliance's sake. Beethoven himself followed this philosophy in his immortal trios. Amongst other movements, this Nonetto includes an adagio entitled La Melancolie which provides more than its title might indicate; it is so grandiose, at times so majestically sombre, that the sentiment of melancholy one expects is overshadowed by ideas of a much higher and rare order. In no way do I mean to quibble with the title, God forbid; all I wish to say is that this admirable work is not only melancholic, but also much more. In the Scherzo and Finale one finds details of graceful melancholy as well as vivacious charm, but the Adagio rises up in the centre of the work like the Mont Blanc among its neighbouring peaks; it dominates all; it is a sublime and profound meditation which provides an almost painful impression that cannot be forgotten.

Berlioz later made further comments about this evening in the July 6 edition of Le Journal des débats:

The Nonetto by Bertini... is the work of a great musician with a lively and ardent imagination, who will grow stronger and more powerful if he refrains from his attempts to encourage applause as he occasionally sought to do in the first movement. His peroration was all too obvious and he is seen to be too preoccupied with achieving success and producing effects. This detracts from the free flowing of his thoughts. This fault does not exist in the other parts of the Nonetto. In composing these the author, fully involved in his subject, undoubtedly forgot that he was actually writing for his public, and concerned himself only with the task at hand and the ultimate unity of the work. Which of these last three movements is our favourite? The Adagio, above all, is without question a noble and magnificent inspiration whose sombre poetry reminds us of the sublime greatness of Beethoven's Sonatas. This is admirable.

The Nonetto was reduced to a quintet (flute or violin, violin, viola, cello and piano) by Charles Schwencke, a pianist and composer from Hamburg who was living in Paris. This appears to have been done for amateur musicians: the flute part, which can be replaced by a violin, contains frequent octave transpositions to make it easier to play.

Etudes

Bertini wrote approximately 500 études, ranging from easy studies for young students whose hands cannot span an octave to concert études. They were published in sets of 25 studies each. Roughly in order of difficulty they are:

Études faciles composées expressément pour les petites mains
 25 Etudes faciles et progressives, Op.100
 25 Etudes, Op.137
 25 Études primaires, Op.166
 Introduction à celles de Cramer
 24 Etudes, Op.29
 24 Etudes, Op.32
 Études mélodiques
 opus 86 sur les romances de A. Romagnési
 opus 141 précédées chacune d'un prélude en deux suites. No. 1
 opus 142 précédées chacune d'un prélude en deux suites. No. 2
 Introduction aux Études caractéristiques de l'opus 66
 opus 134
 Études caractéristiques
 opus 66
 Études caprices ou Complément aux Études caractéristiques
 opus 94
 Grandes Études artistiques de première force
 opus 122
 Bertini also wrote several sets of études for piano four hands
 opus 160 L'Art de la mesure pour les petites mains à quatre mains
 opus 149 Études très facile à quatre mains
 opus 150 Études très facile à quatre mains
 opus 97 Études musicales à quatre mains pour le piano
 opus 135 Études musicales à quatre mains pour le piano
 WoO Frère et soeur. Quatre petits Duos pour le piano à quatre mains composés pour Henri et Isabelle.
 WoO Mère et fille. Quatre petits Duos pour le piano à quatre mains suite à Frère et soeur.
 In addition to these, the last five published books of études appear to have been conceived as a set
 opus 175 Études préparatoires
 opus 176 Études intermédiares
 opus 177 Études spéciales de la vélocité, du trille et de la main gauche
 opus 178 Études normales et classiques
 opus 179 Études suite de l'opus 150 à quatre mains pour le piano

Catalogue of works

Early works, without opus
Introduction and variations upon the air of Gondrillon
Celebrated Irish melody as sung in the opera of Guy Mannering with variations and an introduction for the piano forte
Third divertimento for the piano forte
Air with seven variations for the piano forte
Polacca composed pour the piano forte
Again a little trifle. Andante for the piano forte

With opus

{|
| op.11 || Quatrième Divertissement pour le piano forte
|-
| op.12 || Rondeau polonaise pour le piano forte
|-
| op.15 || Rondo pastoral pour le piano
|-
| op.16 || Fantaisie pour piano sur l'air Au clair de la lune
|-
| op.17 || Fantaisie pour piano forte sur le trio des deux jaloux, Ta Fanchette est charmante
|-
| op.18 || Air allemande, varié pour le piano forte et précédé d'une introduction
|-
| op.20 || Trio pour piano, violon, et basse, no 1
|-
| op.21 || Trio pour piano, violon, et basse, no 2
|-
| op.22 || Trio pour piano, violon, et basse, no 3
|-
| op.23 || 
|-
| op.24 || Grand Quatuor pour piano forte, harpe, violon et violoncelle
|-
| op.25 || Première Sérénade pour piano, violon, alto, et violoncelle
|-
| op.26 || 
|-
| op.27 || Variations pour le forte-piano sur la Romance : Si tu voulais
|-
| op.28 || Air allemand avec introduction varié pour la harpe
|-
| op.29 || Vingt-cinq Etudes pour piano, 1er livre. Introduction à celles de Cramer
|-
| op.30 || Deux Caprices pour le piano-forte
|-
| op.31 || Deuxième Sérénade pour piano, violon, alto et violoncelle
|-
| op.32 || Vingt-cinq Etudes pour piano, 2ème livre. Introduction à celles de Cramer
|-
| op.33 || Nocturne concertant pour piano, violon et violoncelle
|-
| op.34 || Trois Bagatelles pour piano forte
|-
| op.35 || Duo sur Au clair de la lune, pour harpe et piano
|-
| op.36 || Divertissement sur un air de Gluck, pour piano
|-
| op.37 || 
|-
| op.38 || Variations brillantes pour le piano
|-
| op.39 || Troisième Sérénade pour piano, violon, violoncelle
|-
| op.40 || Variations brillantes pour le piano
|-
| op.41 || Polonaise sur le Freyschütz pour piano et violoncelle
|-
| op.42 || L'Angélus de A.Romagnési. Variations brillantes pour le piano forte
|-valign="top"
| op.43 || Grand Trio pour piano, violon, violoncelle. download scan of Richault edition (From the Sibley Music Library Digital Score Collection) 
|-
| op.44 || Variations brillantes pour pianosur le choeur favori de Robin des bois, musique de Weber
|-valign="top"
| op.45 || Souvenirs de Freyschütz (Robin des bois). Variations et Rondo pour piano sur la jolie cavatine L'Infortune, les alarmes et autres motifs
|-
| op.46 || Grande Fantasie. Etude de 1ère force. download music from WIMA
|-
| op.47 || 
|-
| op.48 || Grand Trio pour piano, violon et violoncelle
|-
|― || Sérénade pour piano, violon, alto et basse
|-
| op.50 || 
|-
| op.51 || 
|-
| op.52 || Thème avec variations brillantes pour le piano forte
|-
|― || Douze petits morceaux pour le piano précédés chaqun d'un prélude composés expressément pour les élèves
|-
| op.54 || 
|-
| op.56 || Variations brillantes sur Il crociato Egitto
|-
| op.57 || Variations brillantes pour piano sur une valse autichienne
|-
| op.59 || Trois Valses à quatre mains
|-
| op.60 || Deux petits Rondos pour le piano forte
|-
| op.61 || Variations brillantes pour le piano forte
|-
| op.62 || Le Calme. Andante pour piano forte
|-
| op.63 || Rondoletto pour piano
|-
| op.64 || Deux thèmes pour le piano
|-
| op.65 || Divertissement pour piano
|-
| op.66 || Vingt-cinq Etudes caractéristiques
|-
| op.68 || Variations sur un thème original pour piano
|-
| op.69 || Variations de concert pour piano et quatuor. download music from WIMA
|-
| op.70 || Trio pour piano, violon, violoncelle
|-
| op.71 || No 1. Rondoletto pour piano. No 2. Polacca pour piano. 
|-
| op.72 || Divertissement pour piano
|-
| op.73 || Variations sur un thème original à quatre mains
|-
| op.74 || Six Valses brillantes pour piano
|-
| op.75 || Quatrième Sérénade pour piano, violon, alto, violoncelle contrebasse
|-
| op.76 || Cinquième Sérénade pour piano, violon, alto, violoncelle contrebasse
|-
| op.77 || Rondino à quatre mains
|-
| op.78 || Variations brillantes pour piano sur un thème original
|-
| op.79 || Première grand Sextuor pour piano forte, deux violons, alto, violoncelle et contrebasse
|-
| op.80 || Six Valses brillantes pour piano
|-
| op.81 || Trois petits Rondos pour piano
|-
| op.82 || La soirée, à quatre mains
|-
| op.83 || Six Divertissements à quatre mains
|-
| op.84 || Le Rudiment du Pianiste ou réunion des exercises les plus indispensables pour acquérir un mécanisme parfat
|-
| op.85 || Second grand Sextuor pour piano forte, deux violons, alto, violoncelle et contrebasse
|-
| op.86 || Etudes mélodiques sur des romances de A.Romagnési
|-
| op.87 || Trois nocturnes pour piano download music from WIMA
|-
| op.88 || Ma Normandie. Romance favorite de Mr F.Bérat variée pour le piano download music from WIMA
|-
| op.89 || Rondino alla polacca pour le piano
|-
| op.90 || Troisième grand Sextuor pour piano, deux violons, alto, violoncelle et contrebasse
|-
| op.91 || Rondino, sur un motif de L'Orgie, pour piano
|-
| op.92 || Souvenirs du Barbier. Duo concertant pour piano et violon et basse ad libitum
|-
| op.93 || Grande Polonaise ave orchestre ad libitium download music from WIMA
|-
| op.94 || Vingt-cinq Etudes caprice ou Complément aux Etudes caractéristiques
|-
| op.95 || Souvenirs dAnna Bolena. Duo concertant pour piano et violon avec accompagnement de basse ad libitum
|-
| op.96 || Caprice sur Le Pirate pour piano, violon et contrebasse ad libitum
|-valign="top"
| op.97 || Vingt-cinq Etudes musicales à quatre mains pour le piano. Le but de cet ouvrage est de faire aux élèves un exercise spécial de la mesure, du rythme et de la phrase musicale
|-
| op.98 || Episode d'un bal. Rondo caractéristique pour piano
|-
| op.99 || No 1. Rondeau Galop sur La Sentinelle perdue. No 2. Rondeau Valse sur La Sentinelle perdue. 
|-
| op.100 || Vingt-cinq Etudes facile composées expressément pour les petites mains qui ne peuvent encore embrasser l'étendue de l'octave
|-
| op.101 || Le Repos. Vingt-quatre leçons mélodiques
|-
| op.102 || Deux Nocturnes download music from WIMA
|-
| op.103 || Adieu beau rivage de France. Rondo barcarolle pour le piano
|-
| op.104 || Jura. Impressions de voyage, les souvenirs pour piano
|-
| op.105 || Grand Rondo de concert avec orchestre download music from WIMA
|-
| op.106 || Dell' aura tua profetica, choeur de Norma varié pour le piano download music from WIMA
|-
| op.107 || Nonetto en ré pour piano, flûte, hautbois, alto, violoncelle, cor, basson, trompette et contrebasse
|-
| op.108 || Caprice sur la romance de Grisar, Les laveuses du couvent, pour le piano
|-
| op.109 || Solo composé pour le concours de 1836. Ecole royale de musique, classe de piano de L.Adam download music from WIMA
|-
| op.110 || Caprice pour piano sur l'opera Sarah
|-
| op.111 || Son mom. Rondo caprice pour piano sur la romance favouite de Melle Loïsa Puget
|-
| op.112 || Fantaisie sur Le Caevalier de Canolle
|-
| op.113 || Ernestine. Grande Fantaisie sur un thème de Paddini intercalée par Rubini dans La Straniera download music from WIMA
|-
| op.114 || Quatrième grand Sextuor pour piano, violon, deux altos, violoncelle et contrebasse
|-
| op.115 || Caprice pour piano sur Le Postillon de Lonjumeau
|-
| op.116 || Fantaisie sur Le Postillon de Lonjumeau
|-
| op.117 || Caprice pour le piano sur des motifs de L'Ambassedrice d'Auber
|-
| op.118 || Grande Fantaisie dramatique pour le piano download music from WIMA
|-
| op.119 || Duex Nocturnes pour le piano. No 1. Sympathie No 2. Souvenir
|-
| op.120 || Grande Fantaisie à quatre mains pour le piano sur les motifs de l'opéra Le domino noir d'Auber
|-valign="top"
| op.121 || Deuxième Solo composé pour le piano pour le concours de 1838. Ecole royale de musique, classe de piano de L.Adam download music from WIMA
|-
| op.122 || Vingt-cinq Grandes Etudes artistiques de première force d'exécution en deux suites
|-
| op.123 || 
|-
| op.124 || Cinquième Sextuor pour piano, violon, deux altos, violoncelle et contrebasse
|-
| op.125 || 
|-
| op.126 || Fantaisie à quatre mains pour piano sur deux motifs de l'opéra Robert Devereux de Donizetti
|-
| op.127 || Frande fantaisie pour le piano sur l'opéra L'Elisire d'Amour
|-
| op.128 || 
|-
| op.129 || 
|-
| op.130 || Deux Nocturnes No 1. Contenpiazone No 2. Inquieto
|-
| op.131 || Grand Caprice pour piano à quatre mains sur un motif de La Straniera de Bellini
|-
| op.132 || Souvenirs de Zanetta, l'opéra d'Auber. Grand Duo
|-
|― || Petit quatuor à cordes
|-
| op.133 || Première symphonie pour orchestre
|-
| op.134 || Vingt-cinq Etudes pour le piano. Introduction aux Etudes caractéristiques de l'opus 66
|-
| op.135 || Vingt-cinq Etudes musicales pour piano à quatre mains
|-
| op.136 || Grande fantaisie à quatre mains sur Les Diamants de la couronne
|-
| op.137 || Vingt-cinq Etudes élémentaires pour les petites mains
|-
| op.138 || Deuxième symphonie pour orchestre
|-
| op.139 || Duo à quatre mains pour le piano sur thèmes du Duc d'Olonne, opéra d'Auber
|-
| op.140 || Grand Duo pour piano à quatre mains sur les motifs du Stabat de G.Rossini
|-
| op.141 || Cinquante Etudes mélodiques précédées chacune d'un prélude en deux suites. No 1.
|-
| op.142 || Cinquante Etudes mélodiques précédées chacune d'un prélude en deux suites. No 2.
|-
| op.143 || Le double dièze. Rondino-Etude
|-
| op.144 || Le double bémol. Rondino-Etude
|-
| op.145 || L'impromptu. Rondo-Valse
|-
| op.146 || Sérénade. Caprice sur un motif de Don Pasquale de Donizetti
|-
| op.147 || Etude et andante pour piano
|-
| op.148 || Grand Duo sur La Part du Diable|-
| op.149 || Vingt-cinq Etudes très faciles à quatre mains
|-
| op.150 || Vingt-cinq Etudes faciles à quatre mains
|-
| op.151 || Fantaisie brillante pour piano sur des motifs favoris de Maria di Rohan de Donizetti
|-
| op.152 || Première Sonate pour piano et violon
|-
| op.153 || Deuxième Sonate pour piano et violon
|-
| op.154 || Fantaisie valse, Elvina
|-
| op.155 || 
|-
| op.156 || Troisième Sonate pour piano et violon
|-
| op.157 || Deux melodies de Fr. Schubert, arrangées pour le piano à quatre mains
|-
| op.158 || Les deux soeurs : Deux Romances sans paroles No1. Louise No2. Isabelle
|-
| op.159 || Grand Duo à quatre mains sur les thèmes de Moïse, opéra de G.Rossini
|-
| op.160 || L'Art de la mesure, 25 Etudes primaires pour les petites mains, à quatre mains et en partition pour les commençants,
|-
| op.161 || Morceaux de salon. Grande Marche brillante pour le piano
|-
| op.162 || Cantilena pour piano
|-
| op.163 || Lou Pastour. Souvenir de Sainte Beaume. Fantaisie pour le piano
|-
| op.164 || Souvenirs sur la Durance. Caprice pour piano
|-
| op.165 || Grand Duo pour le piano à quatre mains sur La cloche des agonisants et La poste, mélodies de F.Schubert
|-
| op.166 || Vingt-cinq Etudes primaires pour les petites mains
|-
| ―	|| Frère et Soeur. Quatre petits Duos à quatre mains composés pour Henri et Isabelle
|-
| ―	|| Mère et fille. Quatre petits Duos à quatre mains faisant suite à Frère et Soeur
|-
| op.167 || Trois Solos pour piano de concours à l'usage des pensionnats de jeunes demoiselles
|-
| op.168 || Fantaisie pour le piano à quatre mains sur I Puratini de Bellini
|-
| op.169 || Duo pour le piano à quatre mains sur Norma de Bellini
|-
| op.170 || Fantaisia pour le piano à quatre mains sur La Somnambula de Bellini
|-
| op.171 || Trois petits Solos pour piano. Morceaux de concours à l'usage des pensionnats de jeunes demoiselles
|-
| op.172 || Sixième Sextuor pour piano, deux violons, alto, violoncelle et contrebasse
|-
| op.173 || Banockburn. Fantaisie pour le piano à quatre mains sur des motifs de Robert Bruce, opéra de Rossini
|-
| op.175 || Vingt-cinq Etudes préparatoires
|-
| op.176 || Vingt-cinq Etudes intermédiaires
|-
| op.177 || Vingt-cinq Etudes spéciales de la vélocité, de trille et de la main gauche
|-
| op.178 || Vingt-cinq Etudes normales et classiques
|-
| op.179 || Vingt-cinq Etudes suite de l'opus 150
|-
| op.180 || Esquisses musicales. Vingt-quatre morceaux caractéristics
|}

Music published without opus

Vocal Music

Le jaloux dupé. Opéra comique en 1 acte

Caïn. Scène biblique (Biblical scene)
Françoise de Rimini
Cinq Morceaux religieux. Paroles latines à usage des séminaires, communautés religieuses, chapelles et maisons d'education. Ave Maris Stella, O Salutaris, Tantum Ergo, Ave Maris Stella, Ave Maria (Five religious pieces. Latin lyrics for the use of seminarians, religious communities, chapels, and places of education...)
Deuxième Messe à quatre voix pour deux ténors et deux basses avec accompagnement d'orgue (Second Mass in four voices for two tenors and two basses with organ accompaniment.)
La Melodie Religieuse. Collection de motets au Saint Sacrement et à la Sainte Vierge à une ou plusieurs voix avec accompagnement d'orgue (Religious melody. Collection of motets to the Holy Sacrament and the Holy Virgin for one or several voices with organ accompaniment.)

Studies
La Gymnastique des doigts. Préparation à l'étude du piano (Finger gymnastic. preparation for piano studies)
La Semaine du Pianiste. Etudes journalières de la gamme dans tous les tons majeurs et mineurs (The pianist's week. Daily studies of all the major and minor scales.)
Etudes pour le piano forte en 24 exercices (Studies for panoforte in 24 exercises).
Exercices en doubles notes (Exercises for double notes).
Exercices en octaves, exercices en accord (Exercises for octaves and chords).
Premières leçons doigtées et arrangées pour les petites mains (First lessons in fingering and arranged for small hands).
Cinquantes Leçons progressives, faisant suite aux précédentes (Fifty progressive lessons, following the preceding ones)
Douze Etudes spéciales (Twelve special studies)

Miscellaneous piano pieces
La Romanesca
Scherzo en do majeur pour piano
Storielle amorosa pour piano

Collaborations with other musicians
Duos for piano and violin by Bertini and Antoine Fontaine
1er livre. L'Amitié, grand Duo pour piano et violon
2ème livre. 
3ème livre. Fantaisie et variations brillantes sur un air suisse pour piano et violon concertantes
4ème livre. Fantaisie concertante sur Robin des Bois pour piano et violon
5ème livre. L'automne. Grand duo concertant pour piano et violon
6ème livre. La Conversation. Duo concertant pour piano et violon
7ème livre. Duetto pour piano et violon
8ème livre. Serenata pour piano et violon
9ème livre. Notturno pour piano et violon

Duo for piano and violin by Bertini and Auguste Franchomme
Thème varié pour piano et violoncelle

Duo for piano and flute by Bertini and Joseph Guillou
Fantaisie pour piano et flûte

Arrangements
Collection des préludes et fugues de Sébastien Bach arrangés pour le piano à quatre mains. Ecole de la musique d' ensemble. Etudes spéciales du style élévé, de la mesure et de toutes les combinaisons les plus difficiles du rythme. (Collection of preludes and fugues by Sebastian Bach arranged for piano with four hands. School of ensemble music. Special studies of elevated style, of measures (bars) and of all the most difficult combinations of rhythm.)

Methods
Méthode pratique pour le piano forte rédigée d'après le mode d'enseignement indiqué par J. Jacotet et composée de morceaux choisis (Practical method for the pianoforte'' edited according to the teaching method described by J. Jacotet and composed of chosen pieces.)
Méthode élémentaire et facile de piano (Simple, elementary method for the piano).
Méthode complète et progressive de piano (Complete and progressive method for the piano).

Works fingered by Bertini
Muzio Clémenti, Etudes journières des gammes. (Muzio Clémenti, Daily studies of scales.)

Notes

References

External links

French male classical composers
French Romantic composers
19th-century French male classical pianists
1798 births
1876 deaths
Musicians from London
19th-century classical composers
19th-century French composers